The College of Anaesthesiologists of Ireland (CAI) is the professional association and educational institution responsible for the medical specialty of anaesthesiology throughout Ireland. It sets standards in anaesthesiology, critical care, and pain medicine, and for the training of anaesthesiologists, critical care physicians and pain medicine physicians. It also holds examinations for anaesthesiologists in training, jointly publishes the British Journal of Anaesthesia and BJA Education, and informs and educates the public about anaesthesiology. Its headquarters are in Dublin, Ireland.

Founded in 1959 as a faculty of the Royal College of Surgeons in Ireland (and therefore named the Faculty of Anaesthetists, Royal College of Surgeons in Ireland), the body's first dean was Dr Tom Gilmartin. It was reconstituted as a college in its own right in 1998 - although it initially remained under the aegis of the RCSI (as the College of Anaesthetists, Royal College of Surgeons in Ireland) - and it moved to its own premises in Merrion Square. The name was changed to College of Anaesthetists of Ireland on becoming fully independent. The present title was adopted in 2018, following a plebiscite of fellows, tying in with the specialty in Ireland being renamed from "anaesthesia" to the more international name of "anaesthesiology".

References

Anesthesiology organizations
Medical education in the Republic of Ireland
Medical associations based in Ireland